Bandabi may refer to:

 Bandabi (Bandak Siah), a village in Tamin Rural District, Iran
 Bandabi, the mascot of the 2018 Paralympic Games; see Soohorang and Bandabi